No More Rules is Mika Nakashima's second compilation Japanese album and her tenth album overall. The album is composed of Kanebo Kate Cosmetics Tie-up songs. It includes a new song, GAME, which was used as the tie-up song for the Kanebo Kate Cosmetics Commercial entitled 'Stolen Jewel.'

This album, which includes jazz and rock-oriented songs, was limited to 50,000 copies in Japan (selling 55,938 copies), and is a Blu-Spec CD with a bonus DVD. The album is also currently available in Hong Kong as a CD+DVD, and was #1 on the Taiwan Album Chart.

Track listing

Charts and sales

Oricon sales charts (Japan)

2009 greatest hits albums
Mika Nakashima albums